Campus Bay is a baylet of the Richmond Inner Harbor in Richmond, California formed by conflicting drainage on opposite ends from Meeker Slough Creek and Baxter Creek's deltas Meeker Slough and Stege Marsh. The area is formed of intertidal mud flats which are generally submerged except for the lowest of tides. The baylet borders the Campus Bay neighborhood and is a highly environmentally sensitive area due to being one of the few remaining wetlands areas in the San Francisco Bay and from pollution from a former UC Berkeley Field Station.

Landforms of Contra Costa County, California
Geography of Richmond, California
Bays of San Francisco Bay